Ezana ( ‘Ezana, unvocalized ዐዘነ ‘zn; also spelled Aezana or Aizan) was ruler of the Kingdom of Aksum, an ancient kingdom located in what is now Eritrea and Ethiopia. (320s – c. 360 AD). He himself employed the style (official title) "king of Saba and Salhen, Himyar and Dhu-Raydan". Tradition states that ‘Ezana succeeded his father Ella Amida (Ousanas) as king while still a child but his mother, Sofya then served as regent until he came of age. He conquered the Kingdom of Kush around the year 350 AD.

Reign

Ezana was the first monarch of the Kingdom of Aksum to embrace Christianity, after he  was converted by his slave-teacher, Frumentius. He was the first monarch after Za Haqala (possibly Zoskales) to be mentioned by contemporary historians, a situation that lead S. C. Munro-Hay to comment that he was "the most famous of the Aksumite kings before Kaleb." In early life he considered himself a son of Mars, but later inscriptions show a growing attachment to Christianity. His childhood tutor, the Syrian Christian Frumentius, became head of the Ethiopian Church. A surviving letter from the Arian Roman emperor Constantius II is addressed to ‘Ezana and his brother Saizana and requests that Frumentius be sent to Alexandria to be examined for doctrinal errors and be replaced by Theophilos the Indian; Munro-Hay assumes that ‘Ezana either refused or ignored this request.

‘Ezana also launched several military campaigns, which he recorded in his inscriptions. A pair of inscriptions on a stela in Ge'ez found at Meroë is thought of as evidence of a campaign in the fourth century, either during ‘Ezana's reign, or by a predecessor like Ousanas. While some authorities interpret these inscriptions as proof that the Aksumites destroyed the kingdom of Meroë, others note that archaeological evidence points to an economic and political decline in Meroë around 300. Moreover, some view the stela as military aid from Axum to Meroë to quell the revolt and rebellion by the Nuba. However, conclusive evidence and proof to which view is correct is not currently available.

On some of the Aksumite coins minted during ‘Ezana's reign appears the motto in Greek ΤΟΥΤΟ ΑΡΕΣΗ ΤΗ ΧΩΡΑ – "May this please the country". Munro-Hay comments that this motto is "a rather attractive peculiarity of Aksumite coinage, giving a feeling of royal concern and responsibility towards the people's wishes and contentment". A number of coins minted bearing his name were found in the late 1990s at archaeological sites in India, indicating trade contacts in that country. A remarkable feature of the coins is a shift from a pagan motif with disc and crescent to a design with a cross. ‘Ezana is also credited for erecting several stelae and obelisks. An inscription in Greek gives the regnal claims of Ezana:

Ezana is unknown in the King Lists even though the coins bear this name. According to tradition, Emperors Abreha and Asbeha ruled Ethiopia when Christianity was introduced. It may be that these names were later applied to ‘Ezana and his brother or that these were their baptismal names.

Veneration 
Along with his brother, Saizan (Sazan), Ezana (Aizan) is regarded as a saint by the Ethiopian Orthodox Tewahedo Church and Catholic Church, with a feast day of the first of October and on 27 October.

See also
 Ezana Stone

References

Further reading
 Yuri M. Kobishchanov. Axum (Joseph W. Michels, editor; Lorraine T. Kapitanoff, translator). University Park, Pennsylvania: University of Pennsylvania, 1979. 
 Sergew Hable Sellassie.  Ancient and Medieval Ethiopian History to 1270  (Addis Ababa:  United Printers, 1972).
 African Zion, the Sacred Art of Ethiopia, (New Haven:  Yale University Press, 1993).

Converts to Christianity from pagan religions
Ethiopian saints
Kings of Axum
4th-century Christian saints
4th-century Christianity
Christian monarchs
Christian royal saints